Celebrity Home Entertainment (also known as simply Celebrity Video), founded by Noel C. Bloom in 1987, was a home video distributor specializing in mostly obscure material from around the world, as well as B-grade action films and softcore adult fare.  They also distributed some material that was very popular at the time of its original release, including BraveStarr, Filmation's Ghostbusters, COPS and the 1987 G.I. Joe movie. It was formed after he left International Video Entertainment, which was sold off to Carolco Pictures in 1986. In 1987, the company offered the rights to the Video Gems catalog for Chapter 11 bankruptcy proceedings, but the company had withdrawn the offer after a lawsuit last week.

They were perhaps best known (such as they were) for their "Just for Kids" imprint.  This imprint offered child-oriented and/or animated material broadcast on television in the United States as well as English-language versions of foreign programming and original acquisitions. Among their most notable offerings were Japanese anime, such as the RAI/TMS joint productions Sherlock Hound and Tottoi (The Secret of the Seal). European productions distributed on this label included the French animated series Clémentine, the BBC's Postman Pat, Jannik Hastrup's Samson & Sally, Vuk (The Little Fox), Bibifoc (Seabert), and the Dutch-produced The Bluffers. Some Russian productions had also found release through the company, including The Adventures of Buratino (released as The All New Adventures of Pinocchio) and Maria, Mirabela (released as Maria & Marabella). At launch, other two labels were established by Celebrity, which are Feature Creatures, devoted to sci-fi fare and Let's Party, which was devoted to "upbeat, one-of-a-kind" titles. At that time, some of former IVE and Media Home Entertainment employees have been defected to Celebrity.

In addition to their animated offerings, the company licensed a share of Japanese tokusatsu productions (all dubbed by Sandy Frank), including five of the eight entries of Daiei's Gamera films from the Shōwa era.

However, most of these productions reflected the times, being edited to reflect U.S. broadcast standards. Further, some, though not all, TV series releases were edited into one or two compilation films (ex: the aforementioned Clémentine, plus Wee Wendy) (Tongari Boushi no Memoru). Some series were never even finished, and the videos themselves usually only contained selected episodes. The "Just for Kids" videos were hosted by Noel C. Bloom's son, Noel Bloom Jr.

Celebrity Home Entertainment filed for bankruptcy protection in 1991, and it closed down completely in 2001. All of their releases are now out of print (although some can still be bought new), while some has been reprinted by other companies; for example, The All New Adventures of Pinocchio was re-released on VHS and DVD by Warner Home Video and The Adventures of Scamper the Penguin is currently distributed by Feature Films for Families.

Bloom's son, Noel Bloom Jr. made appearances in the beginning of every Celebrity Home Entertainment video, giving advice to the viewers on how to adjust the tracking on the TV. He also made appearances in giving introductions to the upcoming previews of the videos.

Media distributed by Celebrity Home Entertainment

Other companies founded by Noel C. Bloom
 Artisan Entertainment - Founded in 1981 as Family Home Entertainment; changed its name to International Video Entertainment (IVE), then changed again to LIVE Entertainment Co., and in 1998 to Artisan. Operating as a subsidiary of Lionsgate as of 2003.
 Caballero Home Video
 Monterey Home Video

References

External links
 A list of every title that the company ever released; also includes non-"Just For Kids" titles (from the Internet Archive)
 Reviews of a number of "Just For Kids" anime titles (last updated in October 2010)

Home video companies of the United States
Entertainment companies based in California
Entertainment companies established in 1987
Mass media companies disestablished in 2001
Companies that filed for Chapter 11 bankruptcy in 1991
1987 establishments in California
2001 disestablishments in California
Defunct companies based in California